Fried bake is a Caribbean dish. Many West Indian nations including  Trinidad and Tobago, Guyana, Saint Lucia, Saint Vincent and the Grenadines, Dominica and Grenada eat this dish. The main ingredient in fried bake is flour. It can be served in a multitude of ways. This dish is usually served with salt fish and steamed vegetables.

See also
Trinidad and Tobago cuisine
Cuisine of Jamaica
 Cuisine of Dominica
 Bhatoora, a similar fried bread found in North India
Culture of Grenada

References

Baked goods
Caribbean cuisine
Grenadian cuisine
Guyanese cuisine
Trinidad and Tobago cuisine
Saint Lucian cuisine